Billy Apple  (born Barrie Bates; 31 December 19356 September 2021) was a New Zealand/USA artist, whose work is associated with the British and New York schools of pop art in the 1960s and NY's Conceptual Art movement in the 1970s. He worked alongside artists like Andy Warhol and David Hockney before opening the second of the seven New York Not-for-Profit spaces in 1969. His work is held in the permanent collections of Tate Britain, Scottish National Gallery of Modern Art, Philadelphia Museum of Art, Guggenheim Museum, Chrysler Museum of Art, Detroit Institute of Arts, National Gallery of Australia, Te Papa, Auckland Art Gallery, the Christchurch Art Gallery, the University of Auckland, and the Stedelijk Museum voor Actuele Kunst in Belgium.

Early life 
Barrie Bates was born in the Auckland suburb of Royal Oak on 31 December 1935, the eldest child of Marjia (née Petrie) and Albert Bates. He attended Mount Albert Grammar School, but left secondary school aged 15 without qualifications. He took a job as a technician for a paint manufacturer in 1951 where he developed a proportional system of mixing paint rather than colour matching by eye. He then worked as a junior in design and advertising notably designing the Farmers Department Store logo. Bates attended evening classes at Elam School of Fine Arts, where he met Robert Ellis, a graduate of the Royal College of Art in London.

In 1959 he left New Zealand on a New Zealand Government scholarship to study at the Royal College of Art, London, from 1959 to 1962. During his time at the RCA, Apple made friends with fellow students Ridley Scott and David Hockney and went on to become one of a new generation of pop artists, which included amongst others, Derek Boshier, Frank Bowling, and Pauline Boty. During this time, he frequently exhibited  in the Young Contemporaries and Young Commonwealth Artists exhibitions alongside Frank Bowling, Jonathan Kingdon, Bill Culbert, Jan Bensemann, and Jerry Pethick.. His relationship with novelist Ann Quin then secretary of the RCA painting school and David Hockney are the subjects of Anthony Byrt's book, The Mirror Seemed Over: Love and Pop in London, 1962, which unearths a more interesting and complicated picture for the development of pop art.

Billy Apple 
Bates conceived a new artistic persona and on Thanksgiving Day, November 22, 1962, he bleached his hair and eyebrows with Lady Clairol Instant Cremé Whip and became Billy Apple. He announced his self-branding name change publicly in 1963 in his first solo show – Apple Sees Red: Live Stills – at Victor Musgrave's Gallery One, London. He moved to New York City in 1964.

A pivotal event in his career was the 1964 exhibit "The American Supermarket", a show held in Paul Bianchini's Upper East Side gallery. The show was presented as a typical small supermarket environment, except that everything in it – the produce, canned goods, meat, posters on the wall, etc. – was created by prominent pop artists of the time, including Apple, Andy Warhol, Claes Oldenburg, Tom Wesselmann, Jasper Johns, Mary Inman, James Rosenquist, and Robert Watts.

Apple was one of the artists who pioneered the use of neon in art. This was seen in the 1965 exhibitions Apples to Xerox and Neon Rainbows, both at The Bianchini Gallery. Then in 1967, the exhibition Unidentified Fluorescent Objects (UFOs), which showed a collection of neon light sculptures, was held at the Howard Wise Gallery, a fore-runner to the organisation Electronic Arts Intermix (EAI). One of Apple's UFOs was included in a 2013 exhibition which reconsidered the influence of the Howard Wise Gallery.

In 1969, the artist established Apple, one of the first alternative exhibition spaces in New York City at 161 West Twenty-third Street in order, as he stated, "to provide an independent and experimental alternative space for the presentation of [his] own work and the work of others." Initially, the exhibition space was part of his own studio. During its four years, Apple produced 35 works in the venue and hosted work by other artists including Geoff Hendricks, Mac Adams, Davi Det Hompson, Larry Miller, and Jerry Vis. The space was considered both an exhibition space and a forum for art and discourse.

In 1974, Apple's first major survey exhibition was held at the Serpentine Gallery in London: From Barrie Bates to Billy Apple. In 1975 Apple returned to New Zealand for the first time in sixteen years. During the visit, he embarked on a national exhibition tour with support from the Queen Elizabeth II Arts Council. Apple was then invited back for a tour over the summer of 1979 and 1980. The exhibition he toured was called The Given as an Art Political Statement. During each tour, he exhibited in spaces throughout the country.

During the 1980s, Apple's practice focused on the economics of the art world. The exhibition Art for Sale at Peter Webb gallery in 1980 was made up of a series of artworks that were actual receipts for the payment given to the artist. This work progressed on to a series called Transactions. Other important series of works by Apple that began in the 1980s include Golden Rectangle series and From the Collection. In 1983 he produced a solid gold apple for former Auckland Coin & Bullion Exchange Director, Ray Smith, valued at $(NZ)85,000 – the most expensive work made by a living New Zealander at the time and a significant precursor to Damien Hirst's 2007 diamond skull titled For the Love of God. The gold apple was later exhibited at Artspace, Auckland in 2004 as part of an installation developed with regular collaborator and writer, Wystan Curnow.

He returned to New Zealand permanently in 1990 and lived in Auckland. In 1991 the Wellington City Art Gallery staged a decade survey of his work: As Good as Gold: Billy Apple Art Transactions 1981–1991. Negotiations are underway between Saatchi & Saatchi and the New Zealand horticulture research centre to develop an apple that could be named "Billy Apple". In 2001 Apple created a company, "Billy Apple Ltd", in anticipation of securing licensing of the marketing rights over this new apple.

In the 2005 New Year Honours, Apple was appointed an Officer of the New Zealand Order of Merit, for services to art.

The artist had a long-standing interest and involvement in motor racing, which was acknowledged with two vehicles from his own collection in the 1991 As Good as Gold survey and the accompanying publication. This interest was brought to the fore with The Art Circuit, a sound performance work incorporating famous bikes and riders staged on the Auckland Art Gallery forecourt in 2007. This was followed by the 2008 solo exhibition, The Bruce and Denny Show, presented at Two Rooms in 2008 as a tribute to the McLaren brand, and particularly to the motoring triumphs of Bruce McLaren and Denny Hulme from 1967 to 1969. The exhibition included Hulme's $1.5 million McLaren M8A-2 racing car and text works that refer to the tracks raced and the two drivers' cars' livery.

In 2008, Apple was the subject of a feature-length documentary called Being Billy Apple.  Produced by Spacific Films and directed by award-winning filmmaker, Leanne Pooley, the documentary tells the story of Billy Apple's life from his POP period through his involvement with the conceptual art movement in New York City during the 1970s to his current "horticultural/art" Apple endeavours.

In 2009, the Adam Art Gallery, Wellington staged the survey exhibition Billy Apple: New York 1969–1973, covering the activities undertaken by the artist in the not-for-profit gallery he ran from 161 West 23rd Street. Later in 2009 Witte de With Centre for Contemporary Art in Amsterdam presented a major exhibition in two parts, curated by Nicolaus Schafhausen; the first Billy Apple: A History of the Brand, surveyed the artist's entire practice from inception as his own brand to the present day; the second, Revealed/Concealed, focused on his works that critique the site of art through architectural interventions.

In 2015, Apple was the subject of a major retrospective exhibition at Auckland Art Gallery Toi o Tamaki, curated by Tina Barton. Apple had a citywide presence during the retrospective with many other institutions and galleries in the city independently holding presentations of the artist's work at the same time including Artspace NZ, Te Uru Waitakere Contemporary Gallery, Melanie Roger Gallery, Starkwhite, and the Gow Langsford Gallery. The occasion of the retrospective also saw the commercial launch of Billy Apple Ciders and an application developed by the Albert Eden Local Board called the Billy Apple Compass which could be used to navigate the artist's public sculptures.

In 2009 Apple donated blood to the New Zealand artist and scientist Dr Craig Hilton, leading to a series of three science/art projects by Hilton. In The Immortalisation of Billy Apple® (2010) a cell line from Apple's cells was created using a virus to alter Apple's cells, so that they would keep regenerating forever. The cell lines - named formally after Billy Apple® - are held at the University of Auckland's School of Biological Sciences and the American Type Culture Collection, Virginia, in the United States. In the second work, Hilton commissioned Otago University-based New Zealand Genomics Ltd to sequence Apple's entire genome for The Digitisation of Billy Apple. In the third of Hilton's works, The Analysis of Billy Apple's Genome (2014) the artist presents Apple's personal genetic information in a Circos diagram. Hilton says the works are designed to provoke debate around scientific advances and the ethical challenges they create. Writing in Metro magazine, art critic Anthony Byrt opined:
It's the most complex and radical project Apple has been involved in since the name change. It's also how the brand will outlast the body.

In 2018, Apple was named as an Icon by the Arts Foundation of New Zealand, an honour limited to 20 living New Zealanders.

Death
Apple died on the morning of 6 September 2021 following a "short illness". He was 85.

See also
 Conceptual art
 Institutional critique
 Pop art

References

External links 
 

1935 births
2021 deaths
People from Auckland
Alumni of the Royal College of Art
Conceptual artists
New Zealand contemporary artists
Officers of the New Zealand Order of Merit
Pop artists
People educated at Mount Albert Grammar School